Charles Smith, nicknamed "Red", was an American Negro league pitcher in the 1910s.

Smith made his Negro leagues debut in 1915 with the Philadelphia Giants. He went on to play for several teams through 1919, including the Lincoln Stars, Brooklyn Royal Giants, Bacharach Giants, and Lincoln Giants.

References

External links
 and Seamheads

Year of birth missing
Year of death missing
Place of birth missing
Place of death missing
Bacharach Giants players
Brooklyn Royal Giants players
Lincoln Giants players
Lincoln Stars (baseball) players
Philadelphia Giants players
Baseball pitchers